“Spybreak!” is a 1997 single by the British big beat group Propellerheads from their first album, Decksandrumsandrockandroll. There are two versions of this song, called "Spybreak! (Long One)" and "Spybreak! (Short One)". The former is approximately three minutes longer than the latter.

It appears in The Matrix during the lobby shootout sequence. The version used officially in the movie is titled "Short One". The track's inclusion in the film gave Propellerheads a boost into international recognition.

“Spybreak!” was also included in The Simpsons episode “Lisa the Tree Hugger” and was played while Bart, wearing ninja clothes, posts a Thai restaurant’s menus throughout Springfield, as well as during the end credits.

The song also appears as a repeating backdrop music on the Marvel Comic Heroes at Universal's Islands of Adventure theme park in Orlando, Florida. It was also used for the games in the 71st season of the UAAP. This song was also in the 1997 movie Playing God and in the TV series Malcolm in the Middle and Third Watch. It was also used in an episode of Channel 4 sitcom Spaced.

1997 singles
Propellerheads songs
1997 songs
The Matrix (franchise) music